Mary Seery Kearney is an Irish Fine Gael politician who has served as a Senator since June 2020, after being nominated by the Taoiseach.

Early life
Seery Kearney worked as a barrister, educator and business woman and as chief executive of a housing association.

Political career
Seery Kearney worked as a Fine Gael Parliamentary Advisor and wrote a number of submissions on behalf of Fine Gael TDs participating in the Constitutional Convention.

Seery Kearney served as a member of South Dublin County Council from 2019 to 2020. She unsuccessfully stood for the Labour Panel at the 2020 Seanad election. She was nominated to the Seanad by Taoiseach Micheál Martin in June 2020, and has been described as a possible future Dáil candidate in Dublin South-Central.

Personal life
Seery Kearney lives in Templeogue with her husband David Kearney, also a lawyer, and their daughter.

References

External links
Mary Seery Kearney's page on the Fine Gael website

Living people
Members of the 26th Seanad
21st-century women members of Seanad Éireann
Politicians from County Dublin
Fine Gael senators
Nominated members of Seanad Éireann
Local councillors in South Dublin (county)
Irish barristers
Alumni of Trinity College Dublin
Year of birth missing (living people)
People from Templeogue